The 1989 PBA Fiesta All-Filipino Conference Finals was the best-of-7 series basketball championship of the 1989 PBA All-Filipino Conference, and the conclusion of the conference's playoffs. The San Miguel Beermen and Purefoods Hotdogs played for the 43rd championship contested by the league. This is the first All-Filipino finals series that will be competed in a best-of-seven format.

San Miguel Beermen won their first All-Filipino crown and seventh PBA title with a 4–2 series victory against the Purefoods Hotdogs. The Beermen had won five of the last six conferences and are now getting close towards their bid for a possible grandslam.

Qualification

Series scoring summary

Games summary

Game 1

The Hotdogs caught fire in the third quarter and had their largest lead of 15 points as Nelson Asaytono strung up 10 of his 12 points during that period, Lastimosa, Solis, Capacio and Alolor took turns hitting from the perimeter to propel Purefoods to seven 15-point spreads, the last at 114–99, 3:26 remaining, San Miguel tried desperately to overhaul the Purefoods lead as Ramon Fernandez, Yves Dignadice and Bobby Jose caught fire to close the gap, 108–114.

Game 2

San Miguel led by as much as 18 in the second quarter, 55–37, but the Hotdogs managed to come back from that deficit to close in at 55–61, the Beermen stretch their lead back to 15 at 80–65, Ramon Fernandez outplayed Jerry Codinera in the closing four minutes to preserve the Beermen's triumph.

Game 3

Purefoods open up leads of 69–58 and 73–63 in the third quarter when Glenn Capacio and Jojo Lastimosa started hitting from the outside, Hector Calma and Samboy Lim presided over a late third quarter onslaught as the Beermen wrest the lead at 76–75, Ramon Fernandez and Ato Agustin sizzled in the final period, from an 86-all count, an 11–1 run by the Beermen gave them a 97–87 advantage and never look back, the Hotdogs big men fouled out one by one in the final two minutes.

Game 4

Trailing by five early in the third period at 56–61, an 18–0 blast by San Miguel put them on top by 13 at 74–61, the Beermen keep answering every baskets the Hotdogs made for several 10-point leads in the fourth quarter until the final three minutes when Purefoods came up with a 9–2 spurt to inch closer at 113–110, rookie Ato Agustin went strong to the hoop and scored to give the Beermen a five-point edge.

Game 5

Alvin Patrimonio was held scoreless in the first two quarters, San Miguel opened the third quarter with a ten straight points to up their lead to 17 at 77–60, the Hotdogs slowly came back as Patrimonio finally began to find his range, Purefoods was down by only two, 89–91, going into the last 12 minutes, the Hotdogs got their first taste of the lead in a long while at 95–94, as game five reached its down-to-the-wire finish, Purefoods led by seven, 116–109, when Samboy Lim spearheaded a 9–1 San Miguel attack to regain the upper hand at 118–117, with the score tied at 120-all, only few seconds remaining, Tonichi Yturri scored on a perfect assists pass, on the resume play, Jojo Lastimosa was fouled with 10 ticks left, Lastimosa converted his two free throws to tie the count at 122-all, the game went into overtime, San Miguel last tasted the lead at 129–128 on Bobby Jose's triple but Patrimonio, Asaytono and Capacio orchestrate a strong 12–5 finishing kick as San Miguel key players fouled out in succession. Alvin Patrimonio finish with a series-high 37 points.

Game 6

The Hotdogs were able to take the first quarter at 30–26. Hector Calma, Renato Agustin, Bobby Jose and Alvin Teng came up with an 8–0 bomb starting the second quarter to give San Miguel a 34–30 advantage. At the end of the first 24 minutes of play, the Beermen enjoyed a nine-point spread at 57–48.

Early in the fourth quarter, a three-point play by Samboy Lim off Jojo Lastimosa gave San Miguel a 12-point margin at 90–78. The Beermen padded their lead to 21 points on an 11–0 blitz, starring Samboy Lim and Ramon Fernandez to put them beyond reach, 101–80, with 7:09 remaining in the game. The Hotdogs were held to no more than three points in the first five minutes of the final quarter.

Purefoods gamely fought back, capitalizing on several miscues by the Beermen to cut the deficit to 13 points, 93–106 on a 6–0 run, time down to 4:24. That was the last hurrah for Purefoods as Elmer Reyes did the finishing job by touching off another 8–0 salvo that all but broke the backs of the Hotdogs, 114–93.

Rosters

Broadcast notes

References

1989
1989 PBA season
San Miguel Beermen games
Magnolia Hotshots games
PBA All-Filipino Conference Finals
PBA All-Filipino Conference Finals